Xiakou is a town under the administration of Qingtongxia, Ningxia, China. , it has 13 villages under its administration.

References 

Township-level divisions of Ningxia
Qingtongxia